The Chatt Lecture, named after Joseph Chatt is a lectureship of the John Innes Centre

Lecturers
 2000 Robert Huber
 2002 Tom Blundell
 2003 Stephen J. Lippard
 2004 Doug Rees
 2005 George Whitesides
 2006 Sir Jack Baldwin - "Studies on beta-lactam antibiotic biosynthesis"
 2008 Timothy Richmond, ETH Zurich - "Chromatin structure and remodeling factor interaction"
 2009 Fraser Stoddart, Northwestern University - 'Radically enhanced molecular recognition'

See also

 List of biology awards

References 

Biology awards
Science and technology in Norfolk
Science lecture series